"Lights Out", is a song by American rock band Breaking Benjamin. The song was released in June 2010 as the third single from their fourth album Dear Agony.

Background
An interview with The Weekender, Ben talked about his writing with Jasen Rauch:

Track listing

Chart performance
"Lights Out" debuted at number 40 on the Mainstream Rock chart. It has also reached the Hot Rock Songs and Alternative Songs charts. AOL rated the song as the number-one alternative song of 2010.

Charts

References

Breaking Benjamin songs
2009 songs
2010 singles
Hollywood Records singles
Songs written by Benjamin Burnley
Songs written by Jasen Rauch